Kurt Freiherr von Schröder (24 November 1889 in Hamburg, Germany – 4 November 1966) was a German nobleman, financier and SS-Brigadeführer. He is most famous for hosting the negotiations between members of Paul von Hindenburg's camarilla, Franz von Papen and Adolf Hitler in order to form a government after the German federal election of November 1932, which earned him the moniker "midwife of Nazism".

Life

Schröder was the second son of Frederick Freiherr von Schröder, a financier, and his wife Harriet Millberg, the daughter of a prominent Hanseaten family. He obtained his university degree in economics from the University of Bonn in 1907 and eventually obtained a commission in the Prussian Army as a cavalry officer. Schröder continued to alternate between his job as a merchant banker and a reserve officer until the outbreak of the First World War, which eventually left him disillusioned after the Armistice of Compiègne. Dissatisfied with the instability of the Weimar Republic, he first joined the center right and pro-monarchist German People's Party led by Gustav Stresemann. After Stresemann's death Schröder increasingly veered towards the nascent National Socialist movement before becoming an influential fundraiser and economic advisor to the NSDAP.

In 1927 Schröder formally joined the Circle of Friends of the Economy, a pro-Hitler lobbying group established by Wilhelm Keppler in order to strengthen ties between prominent industrialists and members of Hitler's inner circle.

Kurt Baron von Schröder was Royal Swedish Consul General in Köln 1938–1945.

Role in supporting Hitler

Schröder's close ties to politicians across the spectrum of the political right allowed him to form a bridge between the center-right, led alternatively by Franz von Papen and Kurt von Schleicher, and by Adolf Hitler. After Papen's government fell in the November 1932 election, Papen asked Schröder to make an introduction to Hitler at Schröder's villa in the fashionable Braunsfeld neighbourhood of Cologne, which took place on January 6, 1933, and would earn Schröder the nickname "midwife of Nazism". Accompanied by Heinrich Himmler and Rudolf Hess, Hitler ranted against Hindenburg and Schleicher for several hours during which time Schröder was unable to moderate the conversation although Papen and Hitler agreed to continue the conversation further. Schröder's matchmaking eventually paved the way for Hitler to be appointed Chancellor in 1933.
    
Schröder figures prominently in the book by former Hoover Institution scholar Antony C. Sutton titled Wall Street and the Rise of Hitler. As Sutton observes, 
 

After the war, there were attempts to conceal the financing of Nazi regime, some by the former American bankers and officials of the Allied military government, especially by blocking the investigation of the bank Bankhaus J.H. Stein based in Cologne, Germany. This bank, the so-called "bank of the cartel kings", had been suspected to have served as a conduit for funding Heinrich Himmler's SS through deposits by German industrial cartels.

Rewards for support

Schröder became chairman of the board of directors of several major companies in Germany and was president of the Rhineland Industrial Chamber in Cologne.

Postwar

After the Second World War, Schröder was arrested and was tried by a German court for membership in a criminal organization. He was found guilty and was sentenced to three months' imprisonment.

Kurt von Schröder died on 4 November 1966.

Notes

References

The Nazi Hydra in America: Suppressed History of a Century, by Glen Yeadon, John Hawkins

External links
 

1889 births
1966 deaths
Barons of Germany
Businesspeople from Hamburg
German People's Party politicians
Nazi Party politicians
German bankers